Asartodes monspesulalis is a species of snout moth in the genus Asartodes. It was described by Philogène Auguste Joseph Duponchel in 1833 and is known from France and the Iberian Peninsula.

The wingspan is 14–19 mm. Adults are brownish grey. The hindwings are dark brownish grey with whitish striations in males.

References

Moths described in 1833
Phycitini
Moths of Europe